A Little Mood for Love (lit. Xiaomin's Home) is a 2021 Chinese romance drama television series based on Yi Bei's novel of the same name, directed by Wang Jun and starring Zhou Xun, Huang Lei, Tang Yixin, Tu Songyan and Liu Lili. It aired on Hunan TV and Youku on December 11, 2021. It is also available for streaming on Disney+ in selected regions on February 1, 2023.

Plot
Wang Sumin single-handedly raised 2 daughters, Liu Xiaomin and Liu Xiaojie, unexpectedly both of her daughters after the age of 30 were divorced. The husband of the eldest daughter Liu Xiaomin had an affair, she came from a small town to Beijing to find a place to work and got to know Chen Zhuo, who was also divorced like her, they decided to remarry. But Xiaomin and Chen Zhuo both have an uncomfortable ex, their children are growing up and the adults in the family are all over 60 years old, how to get the approval of the other's family and integrate into the family? Each other's life has become an insurmountable obstacle for the two of them.

The youngest sister, Liu Xiaojie, got married vaguely, divorced because her personality did not match her husband. She used to think not to remarry, but she met a talented young man, Xu Zheng and was seriously pursued by the other party. But Xu Zheng is younger than Xiaojie, he is a virgin, and their love encounters fierce opposition from his parents.
Liu Xiaomin and Liu Xiaojie, under the guidance of their mother, used love and tolerance to solve the dilemmas in love, finally found happiness in life and began to grow up.

Cast
Zhou Xun as Liu Xiaomin 
Huang Lei as Chen Zhuo 
Tang Yixin as Liu Xiaojie 
Tu Songyan as Jin Bo 
Liu Lili as Wang Sumin 
Qin Hailu as Li Ping 
Zhou Yiran as Jin Jiajun
Xiang Hanzhi as Chen Jiajia
Han Tongsheng as Chen Tianfu 
Fan Shiqi as Xu Zheng 
Feng Lei as Hong Wei
Wu Bi as Qian Feng
Qi Yi as Lisa
Jeremy Qu as Tong Bing (Xiaojie's ex-husband)
 Liu Fang as Tong Bing's mother
 Bao Da Zhi as Xu Zheng's father

Production 
Filming began on March 8, 2021 and concluded on July 8, 2021.

Ratings 

 Highest ratings are marked in red, lowest ratings are marked in blue

Soundtrack

Broadcast

References

External links

 A Little Mood for Love - Youku

2021 Chinese television series debuts
2022 Chinese television series endings
Chinese television series
Chinese drama television series
Television series based on novels
Mandarin-language television shows
Television series by Linmon Pictures
Hunan Television dramas
Youku original programming
Chinese romance television series